Zachary Bayly (1721-1769) was a wealthy planter and politician in Jamaica.

Early life
In the 1730s, Zachary Bayly was a young boy when his family relocated with him to the Colony of Jamaica. In 1759, his brother Nathaniel Bayly moved to England, and the two brothers conducted a trans-Atlantic family business, using their slaves on their Jamaican estates to create large profits, and using their political contacts to protect their investments.

Slave owner
Bayly was the owner of Bayly's Vale, Brimmer Hall, Nonsuch, Trinity, Tryall and Unity plantations as well 3,000 acres in cattle pens. 

In addition to being a sugar planter, Bayly was also a successful sugar merchant. He also served as a planting attorney for several absentee owners, managing several thousand more slaves for other estates. He was one of the 10 wealthiest Jamaicans in the eighteenth century.

Tacky's Revolt
In 1760, when Tacky's War broke out, slaves rose up in revolt on Bayly's estates at Trinity.

Death and estate
Bayly owned over 2,000 slaves at the time of his death in 1769. His estate was valued at over £114,000 when he died.

Family
He was the brother of Nathaniel Bayly, both being uncles of the politician Bryan Edwards.

References 

1721 births
1769 deaths
Jamaican politicians
British slave owners
Planters of Jamaica
18th-century Jamaican people